Service Pack 2 may refer to:

Windows 2000, Service Pack 2
Windows Server 2003, Service Pack 2
Windows Server 2008, Service Pack 2
Windows Vista, Service Pack 2
Windows XP, Service Pack 2
Note: Service Pack 2 may also refer to patches released for a number of other Microsoft products.